Martin Koopman (born 5 June 1956 in Wezep) is a Dutch former football defender, who played for Go Ahead Eagles, FC Twente and Cambuur Leeuwarden. He could also play as a midfielder. After 2 years as a youth coach then 8 as an assistant coach (1989 to 1999), he became a football manager in 1999. in July 2021, merely 3 games into his 4-year contract with the Maldives national team, Koopman was successful,first time qualified in history Maldives. board make big mistake to sacked him, after fifa case coach koopman winn his case.

Managerial statistics

References

External links
 Martin Koopman Interview

1956 births
Living people
People from Oldebroek
Dutch footballers
FC Twente players
Go Ahead Eagles players
SC Cambuur players
Eredivisie players
Eerste Divisie players
Association football midfielders
Dutch football managers
FC Den Bosch managers
SC Veendam managers
AS Vita Club managers
Guangzhou City F.C. managers
Roda JC Kerkrade managers
Al Nassr FC managers
RKC Waalwijk managers
Aruba national football team managers
Maldives national football team managers
Dutch expatriate football managers
Expatriate football managers in the Democratic Republic of the Congo
Dutch expatriate sportspeople in the Democratic Republic of the Congo
Expatriate football managers in China
Dutch expatriate sportspeople in China
Expatriate football managers in Saudi Arabia
Dutch expatriate sportspeople in Saudi Arabia
Linafoot managers
Footballers from Gelderland